This is a list of companies listed on the Barbados Stock Exchange.

References 

Barbados stock exchange

Barbados